Yernagudem is a village located in the Devarapalle mandal, West Godavari District. It is a junction of 4 roads to cities Eluru, and Rajahmundry and towns Nidadavole, Jangareddygudem. Because of this, it's a popular village for commuting passengers. Yernagudem was once served as taluka.

It was the place where emerging writer and singer Andey Sai keerthana was born. Her mother's maiden name is Potula which is well known in the whole village.

References

Villages in West Godavari district